Timoshino is a rural locality (a village) in Pokrovskoye Rural Settlement, Vashkinsky District, Vologda Oblast, Russia. The population was 7 as of 2002.

Geography 
The distance to Lipin Bor is 84.5 km, to Pokrovskoye is 15.5 km. Vasyukovo is the nearest rural locality.

References 

Rural localities in Vashkinsky District